Zulumoke Oyibo is a Nigerian producer and one of the co-founders of Inkblot Productions. She is one of the women recognized in Variety Women's impact report 2022.

Career 
As an executive producer, she produced Up North in 2018 and Palava.

Zulumoke initiated The Inkblot Women In Film (IWIF) which was set up to deal with issues of women in film industry. Alongside Chinoza Onuzo and Damola Adewale, she launched a podcast titled Inkblot's Meet and Greet in 2021.

Filmography 
Some of the films she produced include:

 Day of Destiny
 The Blood Covenant (2022)
 The Perfect Arrangement (2022)
 The Set Up (2019)
 Superstar (2021)

References

Nigerian women film directors
Nigerian women film producers
Living people
Year of birth missing (living people)
Place of birth missing (living people)